Rachel Gunn, R.N is an American sitcom that aired on Fox from June 28, 1992, to September 4, 1992.

Premise
The series followed the staff of Little Innocence Hospital in Nebraska. Those shown included head nurse Rachel Gunn, surgeon David Dunkle, and Native American Vietnam war veteran Zac.

The opening theme was a cover of the Huey Lewis and the News song "Workin' for a Livin'" sung by Ebersole.

History
The show was originally developed for CBS with country music singer K.T. Oslin to star in the title role.  But in May 1991, it was reported that Oslin had pulled out because she thought the main character was too mean.

After Ebersole came on board in the lead role, CBS ordered six episodes but concluded the show's brash style was not a good fit and seemed more like a show Fox would air.  The show was later picked up by Fox.  On June 10, 1992, Fox announced that the show would debut on Sunday June 28, in the 8:30pm Eastern Time slot, a summer time replacement for Roc.  At first it was announced that six episodes would air, though 13 had been ordered.  After seven episodes aired, the show was moved to 9:30 Eastern on Fridays, for three weeks.

The creator and executor producer of the show was Katherine Green, also a producer on Married... with Children.  As a University of Oklahoma graduate, she made sure that branded materials from that school and also Oklahoma State University appeared on the set of the show.

Though Ebersole got credit for her performance, the show received generally negative reviews.  In one of the more salacious reviews, People opined that "Fox is scraping the bottom of the bedpan with this summer sitcom," which it deemed an "ugly insultfest" and the "idiot cousin" of NBC show Nurses. The series was not a ratings hit and was canceled less than three months of its initial airing.

Cast
Christine Ebersole as Rachel Gunn
Kevin Conroy as Dr. David Dunkle
Megan Mullally as Becky Jo
Kathleen Mitchell as Sister Joan
Bryan Brightcloud as Zac
Dan Tullis Jr. as Dane Grey
Lois Foraker as Jeanette

Episodes

References

External links

Fox Broadcasting Company original programming
1990s American sitcoms
1992 American television series debuts
1992 American television series endings
1990s American medical television series
Television shows set in Nebraska
English-language television shows
Television series by Sony Pictures Television